Joshua Humphreys (June 17, 1751 – January 12, 1838) was an American ship builder and naval architect.  He was the constructor of the original six frigates of the United States Navy and is known as the "Father of the American Navy".

Humphreys was born in Ardmore, Haverford Township, Pennsylvania, and died in the same place.  He was the son of Joshua Humphreys and Sarah Williams, grandson of Daniel Humphreys and Hannah Wynne (daughter of Dr. Thomas Wynne). He was a nephew of Charles Humphreys. His residence, Pont Reading, is still a private residence.

Career
As a youth, Humphreys was apprenticed to a shipbuilder in Philadelphia, Pennsylvania. During his apprenticeship, his instructor died and he was placed in charge of the establishment.  During the American Revolutionary War he was active as a designer, and played a major part in planning the 32-gun frigate  before the British Army occupation of Philadelphia halted that effort.

In postwar Philadelphia, Humphreys became a shipbuilder in Philadelphia and was one of the most sought after and busiest.  His main shipyard complex was on the Delaware River in the Southwark neighborhood. 

When Congress passed the Naval Act of 1794 providing for the construction of six frigates, it called on him to design them. He was appointed naval constructor on June 28, 1794, and began work on these ships, the beginnings of the U.S. Navy. 

Reputedly, one of the inspirations for his frigate designs was the South Carolina.  His designs called for ships that were longer and wider than usual, sat lower in the water and were able to equal the speed of any other fighting ships.  The ships Humphrey built were more stable than other ships at the time and could carry as many guns on one deck as others did on two decks.

The USS United States was built by Humphreys in Philadelphia, and was the first of the new ships to be launched on May 10, 1797.  These vessels were larger than other ships of their class and formed the core of the Navy during the War of 1812, and scored several victories against British ships, although two were captured. 
His six frigates were:

USS United States (1797)
USS Constellation (1797)
USS Constitution (1797)
USS Chesapeake (1799)
USS Congress (1799)
USS President (1800)
In 1789, Humphreys was elected to the American Philosophical Society.

Family
His uncle was Charles Humphreys, a member of the Continental Congress. His son was another noted naval architect, Samuel Humphreys. His grandson, General Andrew Atkinson Humphreys, served throughout the American Civil War.

Legacy

Building 197 of the Washington Navy Yard was completely renovated in 2014 and renamed in honor of Humphreys.  The building was the site of the Washington Navy Yard shooting on September 16, 2013.

References

External links
USS Constitution Rehabilitation And Restoration
 The Joshua Humphreys Papers, including financial records, hand-drawn diagrams, correspondence and other family documents, are available for research use at the Historical Society of Pennsylvania.

1751 births
1838 deaths
American people of Welsh descent
American shipbuilders
American naval architects
People from Haverford Township, Pennsylvania
United States Navy civilians
People of colonial Pennsylvania
Engineers from Pennsylvania
People from Delaware County, Pennsylvania
People from Montgomery County, Pennsylvania